Fire and Skoal (also known as F&S or FnS) is the fourth-oldest senior society at Dartmouth College and the College's oldest co-ed senior society.  F&S was founded in 1975, shortly after coeducation, and in 1984 moved to its current location at 29 South Park Street, built between 1893 and 1896. It is also known as Golf Haus.

F&S membership is co-ed, exclusive, and secret. Membership consists of a number of senior men and women who are selected during their junior year in a school-wide selection process known as "tapping." Every winter and spring, juniors are tapped for the senior societies through a process semi-coordinated through the College. Taps are decided through individual "lines." Membership is kept secret until the members carry canes at commencement or identify themselves in Dartmouth's yearbook, The Aegis.

References

See also
Dartmouth College student groups
Collegiate secret societies in North America

External links

Dartmouth College undergraduate societies
Student societies in the United States